Garcelle Beauvais (formerly Beauvais-Nilon; born November 26, 1966) is a Haitian-American actress and television personality. She is best known for her starring roles in the sitcom The Jamie Foxx Show and the crime drama series NYPD Blue. She also appeared in the films Coming to America (1988) and its sequel (2021), White House Down (2013), and Spider-Man: Homecoming (2017). In 2020, Beauvais became a main cast member of the reality television series The Real Housewives of Beverly Hills. She also co-hosted the daytime talk show The Real alongside Adrienne Bailon, Loni Love, and Jeannie Mai from 2020 to 2022 for its final two seasons.

Early life
Beauvais was born in Saint-Marc, Haiti, to Marie-Claire Beauvais, a nurse, and Axel Jean Pierre, a lawyer. After her parents divorced when she was three years old, she moved with her mother to the United States at age seven along with her six elder siblings, and settled in Peabody, Massachusetts where she enrolled in elementary school. Upon her arrival to the United States, Beauvais originally only spoke French and Creole, but learned English from watching Sesame Street on television.

Career

Modeling

Beauvais moved to Miami at 16 in an attempt to pursue a career in modeling. After driving down from Massachusetts, Beauvais hoped to interview for a modeling agency without an appointment. She was approached at a red light while putting on lipstick by the very owner of the agency she sought to see. After modeling with this agency for about a year, Beauvais, at 17, went to New York City to pursue a career as a fashion model, after signing with the Ford agency living with Eileen Ford and later modeled with Irene Marie Models. She modeled print ads for Avon, Mary Kay, and Clairol and in catalogs for Lerner New York Clothing Line, Neiman Marcus, and Nordstrom and walked the runway for Calvin Klein and Isaac Mizrahi and also shot TV commercials for Burdines.

Beauvais has appeared on the covers of numerous luxury lifestyle and fashion magazines such as CVLUX, Harper's Bazaar, Sheen Magazine, People's Health issue, VIVmag, Essence, Ebony, Jet, Playboy, Vibe and Hype Hair. In 2017, she was featured on five different magazine covers. In June 2019, she appeared in an editorial for Vogue Italia.

Film and television
She first appeared in the television series Miami Vice in episode 18.

Beauvais portrayed her first acting role in the romantic comedy film Coming to America at age 19. In 1994, she rose to prominence as an actress for her portrayal of Cynthia Nichols in the primetime Aaron Spelling soap opera Models Inc. From 1996 to 2001, she co-starred in The Jamie Foxx Show as hotel employee Francesca "Fancy" Monroe and the love interest of Jamie Foxx's character, Jamie King. From 2001 to 2004, she played Assistant District Attorney Valerie Heywood and the love interest of Detective Baldwin Jones, played by Henry Simmons on NYPD Blue. In 2011 and 2012, Beauvais played Hanna Linden on the TNT law drama Franklin & Bash. In 2013, Beauvais portrayed the First Lady opposite Foxx as the President in the action thriller film White House Down. In 2017, she played the role of Doris Toomes, wife of Michael Keaton's character, Adrian Toomes, in Spider-Man: Homecoming.
She starred in R. Kelly's music video for "Down Low (Nobody Has to Know)", as the wife of Ronald Isley and the lover of R. Kelly, delivering the title line as inducement for an affair. In 2001, after the Jamie Foxx Show ended its run, Beauvais appeared in Luther Vandross' music video, "Take You Out," playing Vandross' girlfriend. She also appeared on some episodes of Grimm as Henrietta. In 2016, Beauvais was named as one of the co-hosts of the syndicated infotainment discussion series Hollywood Today Live after a month-long period of guest hosting the show.

Beauvais recurred as Veronica Garland, the Wicked Stepmother character from Cinderella, on the second season of the web television series Tell Me a Story. She also portrayed Dennis Quaid's love interest in the web television series Merry Happy Whatever. Beauvais joined the cast of The Real Housewives of Beverly Hills as the series' first black cast member during its tenth season, which premiered in April 2020. She began co-hosting the daytime talk show The Real for its seventh season in September 2020. Beauvais reprised her role as a rose bearer in the sequel to the romantic comedy film Coming to America, titled Coming 2 America.

In 2022, Beauvais signed a first-look development deal with NBCUniversal Television and Streaming, via her production company Garcelle Beauvais Productions.

Other ventures
In 2008, Beauvais launched a children's jewelry line called Petit Bijou. In 2013, she published a children's book titled I Am Mixed, which tells the story of twins exploring "the thoughts and emotions of being of mixed ethnicities." She hosts the weekly late-night talk show podcast Going to Bed with Garcelle, in which she discusses dating, sex, and relationships with guests.

Her memoir, Love Me As I Am was published by Amistad on April 12, 2022.

Personal life
She was married to producer Daniel Saunders; their marriage ended in divorce. They have a son, Oliver Saunders, born in 1991. Beauvais married Mike Nilon, a talent agent with Creative Artists Agency, in May 2001. Their twin sons, Jax Joseph and Jaid Thomas Nilon, were born on October 18, 2007. They had dealt with treatment over five years for infertility. In April 2010, Beauvais publicly accused Nilon of infidelity after he admitted he had been having an affair for five years. Beauvais filed for divorce on May 10, 2010, seeking joint custody of their sons.

Beauvais is Catholic.

Filmography

Film

Television

See also
List of people from Massachusetts

Bibliography 

 Beauvais, Garcelle. Love Me As I Am. Amistad (2022)

References

External links

 

1966 births
Living people
20th-century American actresses
21st-century American actresses
Actresses from Beverly Hills, California
Actresses from Massachusetts
Actresses of Haitian descent
African-American actresses
African-American female models
American film actresses
American television actresses
American television talk show hosts
Haitian emigrants to the United States
The Real Housewives cast members
20th-century African-American women
20th-century African-American people
21st-century African-American women
21st-century African-American people
People from Artibonite (department)
African-American Catholics